Franck Lagorce (born 1 September 1968 in L'Haÿ-les-Roses) is a racing driver from France. He participated in two Formula One Grands Prix, debuting on 6 November 1994. He scored no championship points.

Career
Lagorce competed in French Formula Ford between 1987 and 1989, and was runner up in the French Formula Renault Championship in 1990. He stepped up to the French Formula Three Championship in 1991 and won the title the following year. He competed in Formula 3000 for the next two years, winning four races and finishing the 1994 season in second place. He was Ligier's test driver in 1994 and 1995 and drove in the last two races of the 1994 Formula One season when Johnny Herbert moved to Benetton to replace JJ Lehto who had been loaned to Sauber. He then became test driver for Forti Corse in 1996.

He won the Renault Spider trophy in 1996, and has since competed in production car and sportscar racing.

Racing record

Complete International Formula 3000 results
(key) (Races in bold indicate pole position) (Races
in italics indicate fastest lap)

Complete Formula One results
(key)

24 Hours of Le Mans results

References
Profile at grandprix.com

External links
Franck Lagorce Consulting 
Lagorce's Twitter feed

1968 births
Living people
People from L'Haÿ-les-Roses
24 Hours of Le Mans drivers
American Le Mans Series drivers
French racing drivers
French Formula One drivers
French Formula Three Championship drivers
International Formula 3000 drivers
Ligier Formula One drivers
Sportspeople from Val-de-Marne
DAMS drivers
Mercedes-AMG Motorsport drivers
Nismo drivers
La Filière drivers
Pescarolo Sport drivers
OAK Racing drivers